Acacia improcera is a shrub belonging to the genus Acacia and the subgenus Phyllodineae that is endemic to south western Australia.

Description
The spreading spiny shrub typically grows to a height of  It has striately ribbed branches with a waxy white coloured residue between the ribs. It has short, straight and rigid branchlets that are patent to inclined and spinose. Like most species of Acacia it has phyllodes rather than true leaves. It produces yellow flowers in August.

Distribution
It is native to an area in the Goldfields-Esperance region of Western Australia where it is often situated on undulating plains and flats growing in loamy clay or clay soils.

See also
List of Acacia species

References

improcera
Acacias of Western Australia
Taxa named by Bruce Maslin
Plants described in 1999